Koga Dam is a rockfill dam located in Fukuoka Prefecture in Japan. The dam is used for irrigation and water supply. The catchment area of the dam is 2.2 km2. The dam impounds about 9  ha of land when full and can store 985 thousand cubic meters of water. The construction of the dam was started on 1971 and completed in 1975.

References

Dams in Fukuoka Prefecture
1975 establishments in Japan